Leslie Gordon Sullivan (6 August 1912 – January 1996) was an English professional footballer who played as an outside left in the Football League for Bristol Rovers, Rochdale and Chesterfield.

Personal life 
Sullivan was the son of cricketer Dennis Sullivan.

Career statistics

References 

English footballers
English Football League players
1912 births
1996 deaths
Footballers from Croydon
Association football outside forwards
Fleetwood Town F.C. players
Blackburn Rovers F.C. players
Lytham F.C. players
Rochdale A.F.C. players
Bristol Rovers F.C. players
Chesterfield F.C. players
Stockport County F.C. players
Macclesfield Town F.C. players
Brentford F.C. players